Michael Nanchoff (born September 23, 1988) is an American retired soccer player who is currently an assistant coach for the Akron Zips men's soccer team.

Career

College and Amateur
Before college, Nanchoff played for Walsh Jesuit High School in Ohio where he won an OHSAA State Championship in 2006. He then spent four years at the University of Akron playing in three after redshirting the 2008 season. He skipped his final year of NCAA eligibility to sign a lucrative Generation Adidas contract after being named one of the top collegiate players by several sources.

Nanchoff also played for the Cleveland Internationals in the USL Premier Development League.

Professional
Nanchoff was drafted in the first round (8th overall) in the 2011 MLS SuperDraft, thereby helping Akron set a record for the most players drafted in the first round and the most players drafted overall from one school in an MLS SuperDraft. After missing the first several months of the season with an injury, he made his professional debut on June 4, 2011, as a late substitute in a 2–0 loss to Real Salt Lake.

Nanchoff was not retained by the Whitecaps following the 2012 season. On February 13, 2013, his rights were traded to Portland Timbers in exchange for a fourth-round 2015 MLS SuperDraft pick.

on July 9, 2013 Nanchoff was loaned to Swedish club Jönköpings Södra until November 27, 2013.

After splitting 2015 between the Portland Timbers first team and Portland Timbers 2, Nanchoff signed a one-year contract with an option for 2017 with the Tampa Bay Rowdies on January 8, 2016.

Nanchoff announced his retirement from professional soccer on February 28, 2019. Nanchoff joined the coaching staff at the University of Akron the same day.

Personal
Both his father, George Nanchoff, and his uncle, Louis Nanchoff, played for Akron and later in the NASL. Both collected ten caps and scored a goal for the US national team.

Honors
University of Akron
 NCAA Men's Division I Soccer Championship: 2010

Portland Timbers
MLS Cup: 2015
Western Conference (playoffs): 2015
Western Conference (regular season): 2013

References

External links
 
 Portland Timbers bio
 Akron Zips bio

1988 births
Living people
American soccer players
American expatriate soccer players
Soccer players from Ohio
Sportspeople from Cuyahoga County, Ohio
Akron Zips men's soccer players
Cleveland Internationals players
Vancouver Whitecaps FC players
Vancouver Whitecaps FC U-23 players
Portland Timbers players
Jönköpings Södra IF players
Portland Timbers 2 players
Tampa Bay Rowdies players
USL League Two players
Major League Soccer players
Superettan players
USL Championship players
North American Soccer League players
American people of Macedonian descent
Expatriate soccer players in Canada
Expatriate footballers in Sweden
Vancouver Whitecaps FC draft picks
People from North Royalton, Ohio
Association football wingers
Akron Zips men's soccer coaches
American soccer coaches